Cultural competence, also known as intercultural competence, is a range of cognitive, affective, and behavioural, linguistic, skills that lead to effective and appropriate communication with people of other cultures. Intercultural or cross-cultural education are terms used for the training to achieve cultural competence.

Effective intercultural communication relates to behaviors that culminate with the accomplishment of the desired goals of the interaction and all parties involved in the situation. Appropriate intercultural communication includes behaviors that suit the expectations of a specific culture, the characteristics of the situation, and the level of the relationship between the parties involved in the situation.

Characteristics 
Individuals who are effective and appropriate in intercultural situations display high levels of cultural self-awareness and understand the influence of culture on behavior, values, and beliefs. Cognitive processes imply the understanding of situational and environmental aspects of intercultural interactions and the application of intercultural awareness, which is affected by the understanding of the self and own culture. Self-awareness in intercultural interactions requires self-monitoring to censor anything not acceptable to another culture. Cultural sensitivity or cultural awareness leads the individual to an understanding of how their own culture determines feelings, thoughts, and personality.

Affective processes define the emotions that span during intercultural interactions. These emotions are strongly related to self-concept, open-mindedness, non-judgmentalism, and social relaxation. In general, positive emotions generate respect for other cultures and their differences. Behavioral processes refer to how effectively and appropriately the individual directs actions to achieve goals. Actions during intercultural interactions are influenced by the ability to clearly convey a message, proficiency with the foreign language, flexibility and management of behavior, and social skills.

Creating intercultural competence 
Intercultural competence is determined by the presence of cognitive, affective, and behavioral abilities that directly shape communication across cultures. These essential abilities can be separated into five specific skills that are obtained through education and experience:

 Mindfulness: the ability of being cognitively aware of how the communication and interaction with others is developed. It is important to focus more in the process of the interaction than its outcome while maintaining in perspective the desired communication goals. For example, it would be better to formulate questions such as "What can I say or do to help this process?" rather than "What do they mean?"
 Cognitive flexibility: the ability of creating new categories of information rather than keeping old categories. This skill includes opening to new information, taking more than one perspective, and understanding personal ways of interpreting messages and situations.
 Tolerance for ambiguity: the ability to maintain focus in situations that are not clear rather than becoming anxious and to methodically determine the best approach as the situation evolves. Generally, low-tolerance individuals look for information that supports their beliefs while high-tolerance individuals look for information that gives an understanding of the situation and others.
 Behavioral flexibility: the ability to adapt and accommodate behaviors to a different culture. Although knowing a second language could be important for this skill, it does not necessarily translate into cultural adaptability. The individual must be willing to assimilate the new culture.
 Cross-cultural empathy: the ability to visualize with the imagination the situation of another person from an intellectual and emotional point of view. Demonstrating empathy includes the abilities of connecting emotionally with people, showing compassion, thinking in more than one perspective, and listening actively.

Assessment
The assessment of cross-cultural competence is a field that is rife with controversy. One survey identified 86 assessment instruments for 3C. A United States Army Research Institute study narrowed the list down to ten quantitative instruments that were suitable for further exploration of their reliability and validity.

The following characteristics are tested and observed for the assessment of intercultural competence as an existing ability or as the potential to develop it: ambiguity tolerance, openness to contacts, flexibility in behavior, emotional stability, motivation to perform, empathy, metacommunicative competence, and polycentrism. According to Caligiuri, personality traits such as extroversion, agreeableness, conscientiousness, emotional stability, and openness have a favorable predictive value to the adequate termination of cross-cultural assignments.

Quantitative assessment instruments
Three examples of quantitative assessment instruments are:

 the Intercultural Development Inventory
 the Cultural Intelligence (CQ) Measurement
 the Multicultural Personality Questionnaire

Qualitative assessment instruments
Research in the area of 3C assessment, while thin, points to the value of qualitative assessment instruments in concert with quantitative ones. Qualitative instruments, such as scenario-based assessments, are useful for gaining insight into intercultural competence.

Intercultural coaching frameworks, such as the ICCA (Intercultural Communication and Collaboration Appraisal), do not attempt an assessment; they provide guidance for personal improvement based upon the identification of personal traits, strengths, and weaknesses.

Healthcare

The provision of culturally tailored health care can improve patient outcomes. In 2005, California passed Assembly Bill 1195 that requires patient-related continuing medical education courses in California medical school to incorporate cultural and linguistic competence training in order to qualify for certification credits. In 2011, HealthPartners Institute for Education and Research implemented the EBAN Experience™ program to reduce health disparities among minority populations, most notably East African immigrants.

Cross-cultural competence

Cross-cultural competence (3C) has generated confusing and contradictory definitions because it has been studied by a wide variety of academic approaches and professional fields. One author identified eleven different terms that have some equivalence to 3C: cultural savvy, astuteness, appreciation, literacy or fluency, adaptability, terrain, expertise, competency, awareness, intelligence, and understanding. The United States Army Research Institute, which is currently engaged in a study of 3C has defined it as "A set of cognitive, behavioral, and affective/motivational components that enable individuals to adapt effectively in intercultural environments".

Organizations in academia, business, health care, government security, and developmental aid agencies have all sought to use 3C in one way or another. Poor results have often been obtained due to a lack of rigorous study of 3C and a reliance on "common sense" approaches.

Cross-cultural competence does not operate in a vacuum, however. One theoretical construct posits that 3C, language proficiency, and regional knowledge are distinct skills that are inextricably linked, but to varying degrees depending on the context in which they are employed. In educational settings, Bloom's affective and cognitive taxonomies serve as an effective framework for describing the overlapping areas among these three disciplines: at the receiving and knowledge levels, 3C can operate with near-independence from language proficiency and regional knowledge. But, as one approaches the internalizing and evaluation levels, the overlapping areas approach totality.

The development of intercultural competence is mostly based on the individual's experiences while he or she is communicating with different cultures. When interacting with people from other cultures, the individual experiences certain obstacles that are caused by differences in cultural understanding between two people from different cultures. Such experiences may motivate the individual to acquire skills that can help him to communicate his point of view to an audience belonging to a different cultural ethnicity and background.

Intercultural competence models
Intercultural Communicative Language Teaching Model. In response to the needs to develop EFL learners’ ICC in the context of Asia, a theoretical framework, which is an instructional design (ISD) model ADDIE with five stages (Analyze – Design – Develop – Implement – Evaluate) is employed as a guideline in order to construct the ICLT model for EFL learners. The ICLT model is an on-going process of ICC acquisition. There are three parts: Language-Culture, the main training process. 
(Input – Notice – Practice – Output), and the ICC, which are systematically integrated. The second part is the main part consisting of four teaching steps to facilitate learners’ ICC development, and each step reflects a step of the knowledge scaffolding and constructing process to facilitate learners’ ICC development.

Immigrants and international students
A salient issue, especially for people living in countries other than their native country, is the issue of which culture they should follow: their native culture or the one in their new surroundings.

International students also face this issue: they have a choice of modifying their cultural boundaries and adapting to the culture around them or holding on to their native culture and surrounding themselves with people from their own country. The students who decide to hold on to their native culture are those who experience the most problems in their university life and who encounter frequent culture shocks. But international students who adapt themselves to the culture surrounding them (and who interact more with domestic students) will increase their knowledge of the domestic culture, which may help them to "blend in" more. In the article it stated, "Segmented assimilation theorists argue that students from less affluent and racial and ethnic minority immigrant families face a number of educational hurdles and barriers that often stem from racial, ethnic, and gender biases and discrimination embedded within the U.S. public school system". Such individuals may be said to have adopted bicultural identities.

Ethnocentrism 

Another issue that stands out in intercultural communication is the attitude stemming from ethnocentrism. LeVine and Campbell defines ethnocentrism as people's tendency to view their culture or in-group as superior to other groups, and to judge those groups to their standards. With ethnocentric attitudes, those incapable to expand their view of different cultures could create conflict between groups. Ignorance to diversity and cultural groups contributes to prevention of peaceful interaction in a fast-paced globalizing world. The counterpart of ethnocentrism is ethnorelativism: the ability to see multiple values, beliefs, norms etc. in the world as cultural rather than universal; being able to understand and accept different cultures as equally valid as ones' own. It is a mindset that moves beyond in-group out-group to see all groups as equally important and valid and individuals to be seen in terms of their own cultural context.

Cultural differences

According to Hofstede's cultural dimensions theory, cultural characteristics can be measured along several dimensions. The ability to perceive them and to cope with them is fundamental for intercultural competence. These characteristics include:

Individualism versus collectivism 
 Collectivism
 Decisions are based on the benefits of the group rather than the individual;
 Strong loyalty to the group as the main social unit;
 The group is expected to take care of each individual;
 Collectivist cultures include Pakistan, India, and Guatemala.
 Individualism
 Autonomy of the individual has the highest importance;
 Promotes the exercise of one's goals and desires and so value independence and self-reliance;
 Decisions prioritize the benefits of the individual rather than the group;
 Individualistic cultures are Australia, Belgium, the Netherlands, and the United States.

Masculinity versus femininity 
 Masculine Cultures
 Value behaviors that indicate assertiveness and wealth;
 Judge people based on the degree of ambition and achievement;
 General behaviors are associated with male behavior;
 Sex roles are clearly defined and sexual inequality is acceptable;
 Masculine cultures include Austria, Italy, Japan, and Mexico.
 Feminine Cultures
 Value behaviors that promote the quality of life such as caring for others and nurturing;
 Gender roles overlap and sexual equality is preferred as the norm;
 Nurturing behaviors are acceptable for both women and men;
 Feminine cultures are Chile, Portugal, Sweden, and Thailand.

Uncertainty avoidance 
 Reflects the extent to which members of a society attempt to cope with anxiety by minimizing uncertainty;
 Uncertainty avoidance dimension expresses the degree to which a person in society feels comfortable with a sense of uncertainty and ambiguity.
 High uncertainty avoidance cultures
 Countries exhibiting high Uncertainty Avoidance Index or UAI maintain rigid codes of belief and behavior and are intolerant of unorthodox behavior and ideas;
 Members of society expect consensus about national and societal goals;
 Society ensures security by setting extensive rules and keeping more structure;
 High uncertainty avoidance cultures are Greece, Guatemala, Portugal, and Uruguay.
 Low uncertainty avoidance cultures
 Low UAI societies maintain a more relaxed attitude in which practice counts more than principles;
 Low uncertainty avoidance cultures accept and feel comfortable in unstructured situations or changeable environments and try to have as few rules as possible;
 People in these cultures are more tolerant of change and accept risks;
 Low uncertainty avoidance cultures are Denmark, Jamaica, Ireland, and Singapore.

Power distance 
 Refers to the degree in which cultures accept unequal distribution of power and challenge the decisions of power holders;
 Depending on the culture, some people may be considered superior to others because of a large number of factors such as wealth, age, occupation, gender, personal achievements, and family history.
 High power distance cultures
 Believe that social and class hierarchy and inequalities are beneficial, that authority should not be challenged, and that people with higher social status have the right to use power;
 Cultures with high power distance are Arab countries, Guatemala, Malaysia, and the Philippines.
 Low power distance cultures
 Believe in reducing inequalities, challenging authority, minimizing hierarchical structures, and using power just when necessary;
 Low power distance countries are Austria, Denmark, Israel, and New Zealand.

Short-term versus long-term orientation 

 Short-term or Monochronic Orientation
 Cultures value tradition, personal stability, maintaining "face", and reciprocity during interpersonal interactions
 People expect quick results after actions
 Historical events and beliefs influence people's actions in the present
 Monochronic cultures are Canada, Philippines, Nigeria, Pakistan, and the United States
 Long-term or Polychronic Orientation 
 Cultures value persistence, thriftiness, and humility
 People sacrifice immediate gratification for long-term commitments
 Cultures believe that past results do not guarantee for the future and are aware of change
 Polychronic cultures are China, Japan, Brazil, and India

Criticisms
Although its goal is to promote understanding between groups of individuals that, as a whole, think differently, it may fail to recognize specific differences between individuals of any given group. Such differences can be more significant than the differences between groups, especially in the case of heterogeneous populations and value systems.

Madison (2006) has criticized the tendency of 3C training for its tendency to simplify migration and cross-cultural processes into stages and phases.

See also

 Allophilia
 Anthropologist
 Bennett scale
 Cross-cultural communication
 Cultural assimilation
 Cultural behavior
 Cultural diversity
 Cultural identity
 Cultural intelligence
 Cultural pluralism
 Cultural safety
 Existential migration
 Adab (Islamic etiquette)
 Faux pas
 Interaction
 Intercultural communication
 Intercultural communication principles
 Intercultural relations
 Interculturalism
 Interpersonal communication
 Montreal–Philippines cutlery controversy
 Multiculturalism
 Proxemics
 Purnell Model for Cultural Competence
 Social constructionism
 Social identity
 Transculturation
 Worldwide etiquette
 Xenocentrism

Footnotes

References

 
 
 
 
 Groh, Arnold A. (2018) Research Methods in Indigenous Contexts. Springer, New York.  
 Hayunga, E.G., Pinn, V.W. (1999) NIH Policy on the Inclusion of Women and Minorities as Subjects in Clinical Research. 5-17-99
 
 Macaulay, A.C., el. al. (1999) Responsible Research with Communities: Participatory Research in Primary Care. North America Primary Care Research Group Policy Statement.
 Mercedes Martin & Billy E. Vaughn (2007). Strategic Diversity & Inclusion Management magazine, pp. 31–36. DTUI Publications Division: San Francisco, CA.
 Moule, Jean (2012). Cultural Competence: A primer for educators. Wadsworth/Cengage, Belmont, California.
 Nine-Curt, Carmen Judith. (1984) Non-verbal Communication in Puerto Rico. Cambridge, Massachusetts.
 Sea, M.C., et al. (1994) Latino Cultural Values: Their Role in Adjustment to Disability. Psychological Perspectives on Disability. Select Press CA 
 
 Stavans, I. (1995) The Hispanic Condition: Reflections on Culture and Identity in America. HarperCollins

External links

 (video) Building Cross-Cultural Partnerships in Public Health, Alabama Department of Public Health
 National Center for Cultural Competence at Georgetown University
 National Association of School Psychologists
 Competency Assessment Tool From Ministry for Children & Families, Government of British Columbia
 Achieving Cultural Competence guidebook from Administration on Aging, Department of Health and Human Services, United States
  University of Michigan Program For Multicultural Health
 Bridging the Health Care Gap through Cultural Competency Continuing Education Programs 
 Cross Cultural Health Care Program
 What is the Cost of Intercultural Silence?

Cultural anthropology
Cultural geography
Cultural studies
Etiquette
Human communication
Cultural politics
Cultural competence
Interculturalism
Ethnicity